House of Lenin, currently Philharmonic Chamber hall, is a building in Novosibirsk, located at Krasniy Prospect, 32. C.

History

After the death of Vladimir Lenin the residents of Novosibirsk decided to commemorate Lenin's legacy. On  February 10, 1924, it was decided to build a house monument.

The funds were donated by the workers of the town. 
The ground-breaking ceremony occurred on July 13, 1924, and the building was completed in 1926.

Originally the building had elements of the Lenin's Mausoleum incorporated into its facade; however, they haven't survived the later reconstructions.

The House was in the center of public and political life of the city. It was a home of the central library, first Siberian radio station and many other local and regional organizations.

In 1930–1985, Novosibirsk Theater of youth was located in the House of Lenin. Some of the plays in the 1950s located in the theater were considered "creative" and "intense".

The building was reconstructed in 1937-1938 and 1943-1944 to transform its original "revolutionary" shape into a more classical theatrical building.

In 1970 a wall of the building facing Monument to the Heroes of the Revolution was decorated with revolution-themed images.

Finally, in 1985, the theater moved to a new building and the House of Lenin was converted into Philharmonic Chamber hall.

See also
 100-Flat Building 
 Sibrevcom Building
 City Trade House

References

External links
House of Lenin at Letopisi.ru
House of Lenin at  Novosibdom.ru

Tourist attractions in Novosibirsk
Buildings and structures in Novosibirsk
Tsentralny City District, Novosibirsk
Buildings and structures completed in 1926
Cultural depictions of Vladimir Lenin
Monuments and memorials built in the Soviet Union
Cultural heritage monuments of regional significance in Novosibirsk Oblast